Daniel Julius Meltzer (December 17, 1951 – May 24, 2015) was an American lawyer and law professor who taught at Harvard Law School. He worked in the Obama Administration as Principal Deputy Counsel from January 2009 through June 1, 2010.

Education
Meltzer received an A.B. in Economics from Harvard University in 1972, and a J.D. from Harvard Law School in 1975 where he was President of the Harvard Law Review.

Legal career
Upon graduation, he clerked first for Judge Carl E. McGowan of the United States Court of Appeals for the District of Columbia Circuit, and then for Justice Potter Stewart of the United States Supreme Court. From 1977 to 1978, Meltzer was Special Assistant to the Secretary of the Department of Health, Education, and Welfare, Joseph Califano Jr. Thereafter he worked three years in private practice with the District of Columbia firm of Williams & Connolly.

Meltzer joined the Harvard Law School faculty in 1982 as assistant professor, was promoted to full professor in 1987, served as associate dean 1989-93, was named the Story Professor of Law in 1998, and the vice dean for physical planning in 2003.

Meltzer co-authored several books on the federal court system, habeas corpus, and other subjects with Richard Fallon and David L. Shapiro. Criminal procedure was another of his specializations.

In 1989, Meltzer was elected to the American Law Institute and was elected to the ALI Council in 1999. In January 2013, Meltzer was selected to succeed Lance Liebman as ALI Director. Meltzer later declined the appointment for health reasons. In January 2014, the ALI announced that Richard Revesz, the Dean Emeritus of New York University School of Law, would succeed Liebman as ALI Director in May 2014.

White House appointment
Meltzer was appointed Principal Deputy Counsel to President Barack Obama in January 2009, deputy to Counsel Greg Craig. Meltzer had originally agreed to serve in the position for one year but agreed to stay longer to help in the transition from Craig to Robert Bauer early in 2010. Returning to Harvard in mid-2010 allowed Meltzer to resume his faculty position within the preferred two-year leave tenure. At the time of his resignation, his service for the administration was noted for efforts to close the military prison at Guantanamo Bay, Cuba, related policies affecting terrorism detainees, anti-abortion issues in the health care reform debate, and preparation of Supreme Court Associate Justice Sonia Sotomayor in her 2009 confirmation hearings. Also noted was close work during his tenure with the acting leader of the Office of Legal Counsel, David Barron (also a fellow Harvard law professor), and with United States Associate Attorney General Thomas J. Perrelli, both in the Department of Justice.

Personal
Meltzer died on May 24, 2015 from cancer. Meltzer was married to Ellen Semonoff, the Assistant City Manager of Human Services for the City of Cambridge, MA. His wife did not move to Washington during the 2009-2010 appointment, and Meltzer commuted to Cambridge during the period.

Meltzer's father, Bernard D. Meltzer, was a member of the United States prosecutorial delegation to the Nuremberg trials and a professor of law at the University of Chicago Law School.  Meltzer's cousin, David F. Levi, is the dean of Duke Law School. His son, Jonathan Meltzer, was a 2014 Bristow Fellow and clerked for Justice Elena Kagan on the Supreme Court in 2015.

See also 
 List of law clerks of the Supreme Court of the United States (Seat 8)

References

External links 
Harvard Law School profile

1951 births
2015 deaths
Harvard Law School alumni
Harvard Law School faculty
Law clerks of the Supreme Court of the United States
Obama administration personnel
University of Chicago Laboratory Schools alumni